Azima Dhanjee is social activist who works for the deaf community in Pakistan. She is the co-founder and CEO of ConnectHear, a startup which provides sign language interpretation services. Dhanjee has represented Pakistan in Kenya as a Global Encounters’ Participant, in Senegal as an English Language Instructor and in United States as a Cultural Exchange Ambassador.

Social work 

Through her social work for hearing-impaired citizens, Dhanjee aims to bridge the communication gap in the society. She uses methods like video calling interpretation to a build a more inclusive society by providing the deaf community the ease to connect with others. She has also launched a series of videos tutorials teaching Indo-Pakistani Sign Language to people. These videos are a part of her broader plan to educate everyone about common signs.

Dhanjee has successfully organized inclusive events in Pakistan including the first Deaf inclusive concert with Strings Band, Election Accessibility with Geo News and a all Deaf theater competition.

References 

Living people
Deaf activists
Pakistani social workers
Language activists
Pakistani activists
Year of birth missing (living people)